The Complejo Recreativo y Cultural La Guancha (English: La Guancha Recreational and Cultural Complex) is a recreational complex in barrio Playa in Ponce, Puerto Rico, with family recreational and cultural facilities that opened on 23 June 1998. The highlight of the complex is the Paseo Tablado La Guancha, which is flanked by a beach, an observation tower, an amphitheater, and 24 open-air kiosks. It was developed during the administration of Mayor Rafael Cordero Santiago. In October 2017, after Hurricane Maria, it closed to the public to undergo repairs but, as of January 2020, when the area suffered severe damage due to the 2020 Puerto Rico earthquakes, no repairs had been made and, as of 17 June 2020, it remained closed. By late 2020 arrangements were made for the merchants that operated from waterfront kiosks to reopen their businesses out of provisional facilities at a temporary location away from the waterfront while reconstruction of the waterfront area takes place.

History
Originally La Guancha consisted of a road and sidewalk alongside a dike built close to the easternmost shore of barrio Playa across from Ponce Yacht Club.  The romantic area was frequented by families and sweethearts alike, especially on weekends, for relaxation and bonding.  During the administration of Mayor Cordero, however, a number of facilities were added to the La Guancha area at a cost of over $18 million, developing it into a new recreational complex. The new facilities followed the design of engineer Axel Bonilla Cortes.

Facilities
Seven new facilities were added to the existing walkway area:
 The Dr. Enrique "Coco" Vicens Recreational and Cultural Center (Spanish: Centro Recreativo y Cultural Enrique "Coco" Vicéns), which consists of an open-air amphitheater for concert-type facilities and seating some 30,000 spectators. Its stage is known as "Tarima Hector Lavoe".
 A rides and amusement park area, intended for the celebration of Patron Saint's Day Festivals, fairs, and similar festivities
 The Jose Angel Zayas Colon Children's Park, with over 40 games for the youngsters, plus the (Julio and Geraldo) Chamorro-Franceschini Brothers Park, with facilities for the handicapped
 Several parking areas with parking for some 900 vehicles, and distributed throughout the complex
 A majestic fountain, as its main axis, displaying the city's Coat-of-arms and its iconic lion
 A multi-use building providing facilities for the Ponce Municipal Police, medical emergencies and ambulance, and other related agencies
 A nourished beach area with over 10,000 cubic meters of new sand that replenished and built up the previous beach area, and including five beach volleyball courts, gazebos, access ramps to the Caribbean Sea, and associated illumination.

This project complemented the recently inaugurated tourist pier in the nearby Port of Ponce, and which saw an investment of $4 million.

Funding
The Complex was developed by the Department of Community and Economic Development of the Autonomous Municipality of Ponce at a cost of $18.6 million.

Effects of the 2020 Puerto Rico earthquake
The complex sustained damage due to the 2020 Puerto Rico earthquake.

Gallery

See also

 Paseo Tablado La Guancha

References

Further reading
 Fay Fowlie de Flores. Ponce, Perla del Sur: Una Bibliográfica Anotada. Second Edition. 1997. Ponce, Puerto Rico: Universidad de Puerto Rico en Ponce. p. 13. Item 65. 
 Nelson Garcia. "Origen del Nombre de La Guancha." La Perla del Sur. Ponce, Puerto Rico. 23-30 enero 1996. p. 37.

External links
 Complejo Recreativo La Guancha at Explore Puerto Rico
 La Historia Olvidada de La Guancha. Sandra Torres Guzmán. La Perla del Sur. 27 May 2015. Accessed 26 November 2020.

Buildings and structures in Ponce, Puerto Rico
Parks in Ponce, Puerto Rico
Beaches of Puerto Rico
1998 in Puerto Rico
1998 establishments in Puerto Rico
Tourist attractions in Ponce, Puerto Rico